Paa may refer to:

 Nanorana, a genus of frogs formerly referred to as Paa
 Paa (film), a 2009 Bollywood film 
 Paa (given name)

See also 
 PAA (disambiguation)